Gumbihini is a community in Tamale Metropolitan District in the Northern Region of Ghana

See also
 Jisonaayili

References 

Communities in Ghana
Suburbs of Tamale, Ghana